Alcmaeon, Alkmaion, Alcmeon, or Alkmaon may refer to:
 Alcmaeon, the great-grandson of Nestor, from whom the Alcmaeonidae claimed descent
 Alcmaeon (mythology), one of the Epigoni
 Alcmaeon in Corinth, a lost play by Euripides
 Alcmaeon (King of Athens), the last king of Athens
 Alcmaeon, son of Megacles, 6th century BC commander during the Cirrhaean War
 Alcmaeon of Croton (mid-fifth century B.C.), an Ancient Greek philosopher and medical theorist